Victor Vlad Cornea and Fabian Fallert were the defending champions but lost in the final to Marco Bortolotti and Vitaliy Sachko.

Bortolotti and Sachko won the title after defeating Cornea and Fallert 7–6(7–5), 3–6, [10–5] in the final.

Seeds

Draw

References

External links
 Main draw

Città di Forlì V - Doubles